Luga (Finnish: Ylä-Laukaa or Laukaa;) is a town and the administrative center of Luzhsky District in Leningrad Oblast, Russia, located on the Luga River  south of St. Petersburg. Population:

History
It was founded on the banks of the river of that name by order of the Catherine the Great on August 3 (14), 1777. The town developed in following stages:
Initial construction (1777–c. 1800)
Early growth to population of 3,000 (c. 1810–c. 1860)
Intense social and urban development (c. 1870–1910)
Soviet development according to the typical plan for smaller towns (1926–c. 1950)
Reconstruction of the historical town structure (c. 1960–c. 1995)
Transition to free market agro-industrial town (c. 1995–2005)

Luga was founded as a town in Pskov Viceroyalty, but in March 3 (14), 1782 it was transferred to St. Petersburg Governorate (renamed Petrogradsky in 1913 and Leningradsky in 1924) and became the seat of Luzhsky Uyezd. In 1918, important events of the Russian Civil War took place in the area, when the White Army unsuccessfully tried to conquer Petrograd.

On August 1, 1927, the uyezds were abolished and Luzhsky District, with the administrative center in Luga, was established. The governorates were also abolished and the district became a part of Luga Okrug of Leningrad Oblast. On July 23, 1930, the okrugs were abolished as well and the districts were directly subordinated to the oblast. On September 19, 1939, Luga became a town of oblast significance and was thus no longer a part of the district.

The World War II German advance on Leningrad was temporarily halted by seven regular, militia, and irregular divisions in the Luga area and this delayed the commencement of the Siege of Leningrad by over a month. In recognition of this feat, the town was awarded the title of "Hero City" and listed as one of the World War II Cities of Military Glory by Vladimir Putin, the President of Russia. German occupation of Luga lasted from August 24, 1941 to February 12, 1944.

In 2010, the administrative structure of Leningrad Oblast was harmonized with its municipal structure and Luga became a town of district significance.

Administrative and municipal status
Within the framework of administrative divisions, Luga serves as the administrative center of Luzhsky District. As an administrative division, it is, together with four rural localities, incorporated within Luzhsky District as Luzhskoye Settlement Municipal Formation. As a municipal division, Luzhskoye Settlement Municipal Formation is incorporated within Luzhsky Municipal District as Luzhskoye Urban Settlement.

Economy

Industry

There are enterprises of construction, chemical, and food industries in Luga.

Transportation
Luga lies on the railway line connecting the Baltiysky railway station of St. Petersburg with Pskov. Another railway line to Batetsky and Veliky Novgorod branches off east. Both have suburban service.

The M20 Highway, connecting St. Petersburg with Pskov and eventually with Kyiv, passes Luga. In Luga, two more roads branch eastwards: one running to Veliky Novgorod and another one to Lyuban and Mga, largely following the border of Leningrad Oblast.

Education
The town has a university (KGU Kirilla and Mefodiya), three Institutes of Technical Education, and six schools.

Military
Luga is home to the 26th Missile Brigade.

Culture and recreation

Luga contains twenty-five objects classified as cultural and historical heritage of local significance. These include the main sights remaining from the 18th and the 19th century such as the St. Catherine Cathedral (1786) and the Resurrection Cathedral (1872—1877).

The Luzhsky District Museum, the only state museum in the district, is located in Luga.

Twin towns and sister cities

Luga is twinned with:
 Mikkeli, Finland

Notable people
Anton von Saltza (1843-1916) - general
Walter Polakov (1879-1948) - mechanical engineer
Gratsian Botev (1928-1981) - sprint canoer
Nina Urgant (1929-2021) -  film and stage actress
Boris Marshak (1933-2006) -  archeologist
Gennadi Nilov (1936) -  actor
Lyudmila Besrukova (1945) - sprint canoer
Georgi Zažitski (1949) - fencer
Vladimir Bystrov (1984) - footballer

References

Notes

Sources

Cities and towns in Leningrad Oblast
Luzhsky District
Luzhsky Uyezd